Francis Hamel (born 1963) is a British painter based in Oxford. He is known for landscapes and portraits.

Early life and education
Hamel attended Summer Fields School in north Oxford and Marlborough College, and studied at the Ruskin School of Art (1982-1985) while a student of Magdalen College.

Career
In a 1995 Sunday Times article Hamel was quoted as saying that only two others of his 30 contemporaries at the Ruskin School of Art were earning a living as professional painters, and that  "the most important thing is just painting pictures all the time. It takes a terribly long time to get even half decent at it. There is also  a measure of luck thrown in. At the moment people seem to want to buy the kind of pictures I'm painting." He had sold more than a quarter of the works in his first one-man exhibition by the end of the private view.

Hamel's portrait of Brian Fall (2002) is in the collection of Lady Margaret Hall, Oxford.

In 2008 he was commissioned to paint a large group of works for the refurbished Fortnum & Mason store in London.

In 2015 and 2016 he painted a commissioned series of portraits of the 25 past holders of the University of Oxford's Cameron Mackintosh Professorship of Contemporary Theatre. These were displayed at the Victoria and Albert Museum in 2019, causing some controversy as they included a portrait of Kevin Spacey who had held the chair in 2008.

Hamel's 2020 exhibition Painting the Yellow Mountain at the John Martin Gallery showed painting resulting from trips to China and Hong Kong in 2019.

Hamel lives in a cottage in the grounds of Rousham House and during lockdown in 2020-2021 made a series of 80 paintings of the gardens while they were closed to the public. These were exhibited at Rousham and at the John Martin Gallery in London in October and November 2021, and published with essays by various writers as The Gardens at Rousham (Clearview,).

In October 2021 Hamel appeared on BBC Radio 4's The Museum of Curiosity.

References

External links

A Certain Tree Video where Hamel discusses painting trees

1963 births
Living people
British male painters
21st-century British painters
People educated at Summer Fields School
People educated at Marlborough College
Alumni of Magdalen College, Oxford
Alumni of the Ruskin School of Art
21st-century British male artists